Nauru competed at the 2011 Pacific Games in Nouméa, New Caledonia between August 27 and September 10, 2011. As of June 28, 2011 Nauru has listed 69 competitors.

Athletics

Nauru has qualified 16 athletes.

Men
Kevin Baui
Joseph Sorian Dabana
Junior Dagearo
Agassi Jones
Joshua Jeremiah
Jimmy John Harris
Quaski Itaia
A-One Tannang
Francis Togagae
John-Rico Togagae

Women
Vashti Agege
Lovelite Detenamo
 Angelina Grundler
 Nina Grundler
Myshine Raidinen
Kara Thoma

Boxing

Nauru has qualified 9 athletes.

Men
Blanco Wharton -  -52 kg
DJ Maaki
Colan Caleb -  -60 kg
Freeman Tokataake
Joseph Deireragea -  -69 kg
Santana Halstead -  -75 kg
Olanjo Dagagio
Tridence Duburiya -  -91 kg
Jake Ageidu -  91 kg and Over

Judo

Nauru has qualified 5 athletes.

Men
Tomwell Raidinen
Raymiz Dageago
Sled-Tavaoe Dowabobo
O'brien Aboubo
Joseph Iga

Powerlifting

Nauru has qualified 8 athletes.

Men
Awama Johnson Aemoge -  -74 kg
Renack Mau -  -83 kg
Raboe Roland -  -93 kg
Greg Garoa -  -105 kg
Joash Teabuge -  -105 kg
Gabriel Akua
Jesse Jeremiah -  -120 kg
Jezza Uepa -  120 kg & Over

Table Tennis

Nauru has qualified 7 athletes.

Men
Sharkey Itaia
Obrian Itaia
Juweida Stephen

Women
Oxyna Gobure
Serafina Grundler
Alice Taleka
Polly Gobure

Tennis

Nauru has qualified 5 athletes.

Men
Shubers Fritz
David Detudamo
Irving Harris

Women
Vicki Harris
Angelita Detudamo

Weightlifting

Nauru has qualified 3 athletes.

Men
Elson Brechtefeld -  -56 kg Snatch,  -56 kg Clean & Jerk,  -56 kg Total
Deiranauw Bronco -  -69 kg Snatch,  -69 kg Total,  -69 kg Clean & Jerk

Women
Suzanne Hiram -  -48 kg Snatch

References

2011 in Nauruan sport
Nations at the 2011 Pacific Games
Nauru at the Pacific Games